Golam Sabur Tulu was a Bangladesh Awami League politician and the incumbent Member of Parliament from Barguna-2.

Career
Tulu was elected to parliament from Barguna-2 as a Bangladesh Awami League candidate in 2008.

Death
Tulu was killed on 27 July 2013 in a road accident on Vanga in Faridpur District.

References

Awami League politicians
2013 deaths
9th Jatiya Sangsad members
Road incident deaths in Bangladesh